Curtis Olafson (born December 7, 1952) is an American politician who served in the North Dakota Senate from the 10th district from 2006 to 2012.

References

External links

1952 births
Living people
Republican Party North Dakota state senators